The 1970 All-Ireland Minor Football Championship was the 39th staging of the All-Ireland Minor Football Championship, the Gaelic Athletic Association's premier inter-county Gaelic football tournament for boys under the age of 18.

Cork entered the championship as defending champions in search of a record-breaking fourth successive All-Ireland title, however, they were defeated by Kerry on a scoreline of 4–9 to 1–11 in the Munster final.

On 25 October 1970, Galway won the championship following a 1–11 to 1–10 defeat of Kerry in the All-Ireland final. This was their third All-Ireland title overall and their first in ten championship seasons.

Results

Connacht Minor Football Championship

Quarter-final

Roscommon 0-8 Leitrim 0-4

Semi-finals

Galway 4-12 Sligo 1-6

Mayo 3-8 Roscommon 2-5

Final

Galway 2-11 Mayo 1-6 Referee Paddy O'Connor (Roscommon).

Leinster Minor Football Championship

Ulster Minor Football Championship

Munster Minor Football Championship

All-Ireland Minor Football Championship

Semi-finals

Finals

Championship statistics

Miscellaneous

 The All-Ireland final ends in a draw and goes to a replay for the first time in its history.

References

1970
All-Ireland Minor Football Championship